George Jacobs may refer to:

George Jacobs (inventor) (1877–1945), American inventor
George Jacobs, Sr. (died 1692), hanged for witchcraft in Salem witch trials
George Jacobs, Jr., accused of witchcraft in Salem witch trials, but fled
George Jacobs (basketball), American basketball coach
George Jacobs (valet) (1927–2013), memoirist and valet of Frank Sinatra
George Jacobs (bridge player), American bridge player
George Jacobs (educator) (born 1952),  American educator and vegan activist